Tigerlily or Tiger Lily is an occasionally used English feminine given name used in reference to the flower known as the tiger lily due to its coloration that resembles a tiger. It is a flower name also used in other languages such as the Mandarin Chinese name Xuān (萱) from xuān cǎo (萱草). The flower is said to be associated with motherhood in Chinese culture. It was the name of a character in J. M. Barrie's 1904 play Peter Pan, or The Boy Who Wouldn't Grow Up, his 1911 novel Peter and Wendy, and their various adaptations. More attention was drawn to the name after its use by Michael Hutchence and Paula Yates for their daughter in 1996.    It is a name with an image of bold and unconventional beauty, bordering on the outlandish, in Western countries.  It is considered a “guilty pleasure” name by some.

Usage
The name has been in occasional use in English-speaking countries since at least the 1990s but has never been ranked among the most popular names for newborn girls. There were 17 newborn American girls who received the name in 2020 and 11 in 2021.

People
 Tigerlily (DJ), stage name of Dara Kristen Hayes, an Australian DJ and record producer
 Pen name of Lillie Devereux Blake (1833-1913), American woman suffragist, reformer, and writer
 Heavenly Hiraani Tiger Lily Hutchence Geldof (born 1996), daughter of the Australian singer-songwriter from INXS, Michael Hutchence, TV presenter Paula Yates and adoptive daughter of musician and activist Bob Geldof.
 Tigerlily Taylor (born 1994), British model, daughter of Queen drummer Roger Taylor

References

English feminine given names
Given names derived from plants or flowers